Manassas is the 1972 debut double album by Manassas, a blues rock group led by American musician Stephen Stills, released April 1972. It was a critical comeback for Stills, and continued his commercial success by being certified Gold only a month after being released and peaking at number 4 on the US charts.

Recording 
The album was recorded at Criteria Studio B late 1971, where Stills used his clout to keep the studio and engineers Ron and Howard Albert available around the clock. The band all stayed in a rented house about 30 minutes away from the studio, in Coconut Grove. This allowed Stills to record the album around the clock, waking up band members in the early hours of the morning when an idea struck. Stills would also record in mammoth sessions often going on for days, until Chris Hillman and Stills got into a fight, after which they started to record at regular hours. Al Perkins and Dallas Taylor had a rule where they would not perform any more than seven takes for a single track, so often Stills would stay in the studio editing after having released the band at 4 or 5 am. The band then flew to Stills' house in London in January 1972 to finish recording and mixing the album and to rehearse for an upcoming tour starting in March 1972. It was here that Bill Wyman of the Rolling Stones played bass on and co-authored "The Love Gangster" and is reported to have said that he would have left the Stones to join Manassas. At one point Stills put in an unbroken 106 hour stint in the studio, and engineer Ron Albert said he had just gotten to bed after a marathon session lasting 84 hours when the phone rang with Stills summoning him back to the studio with the words: "I know you're tired, but there's this idea I've got for this song that I want to get on tape before I forget it..." Another time, working to Stills' manic schedule, the band cut eight tracks in two days with no sleep.

Songs 
The album was split into four thematic sides. Side 1 - The Raven, is a composite of rock and Latin sounds that the group would often perform in full live exactly as recorded. Side 2 - The Wilderness mainly centers on country and bluegrass. Side 3 - Consider is largely folk and folk-rock, and contains the song "Johnny's Garden", reportedly for the caretaker at Stills' English manor house bought from Ringo Starr. This includes Stills at his most experimental including using a Moog Synthesiser on "Move Around". The closing section, titled "Rock & Roll Is Here to Stay", is a rock and blues set.

"What to Do" and "Right Now" are Stills take on the CSNY split and his relationship with Graham Nash.

Artwork and packaging 
The artwork was taken after Stills, a Civil War buff, had the band flown over to Manassas station in Manassas, Virginia, where the Confederacy had claimed its first major victory at the Battle of Bull Run. The photo they liked was the band standing on the platform under a Manassas sign, and so the band was named. Included with the album were fold-out posters with named pictures of all the members and hand-written lyrics on the back, including a message urging people to 'Use The Power, Register and Vote'.

Chart performance
The album debuted on the Billboard Top LP's chart for the week ending April 29, 1972 and eventually peaked at No. 4 in June, during a 30-week run. Stills' album shared the top 5 with an album by David Crosby and Graham Nash (Graham Nash David Crosby) and an album by Neil Young (Harvest), all collectively members of the quartet Crosby, Stills, Nash & Young. "It Doesn't Matter" was released as a single and peaked at No. 61, during a chart run of 7 weeks. "Rock & Roll Crazies" was released as the second single and peaked at No. 92 during a 3-week run. By 1974, it had sold an estimated 400,000 copies in the US, which is the equivalent of 800,000 as the album is a double.

Reception 
Manassas marked a critical comeback for Stills, with Allmusic calling it a "sprawling masterpiece" and Rolling Stone saying it was "reassuring to know that Stills has some good music still inside him. Most of it has a substantial, honest sound found on too few records these days. All the sounds you hear come from the seven group members". Chris Hillman was singled out as an "importance in the success of Manassas and in the comeback of Stills, he can't be over-stressed [...] He's a masterful musician whether he's playing bass, guitar, or mandolin, and his boyishly pure, uncolored voice can carry a lot of emotional weight.". However, Robert Christgau rated the album C+ and in a mixed review stated "Yes, Steve has gotten it together a little, even deigning to cooperate with real musicians in a real band, and yes, some of this four-sided set echoes in your head after you play it a lot. The only problem is you're never sure where the echoes come from". In positive reviews, Record World called it "music of the highest order", Cash Box said it will "convince you of Stills' worth", and Billboard said it "offers loads of class material". In a June 1972 review for The San Diego Door, Cameron Crowe said "Manassas always remains admirable if not exciting. The musicianship is generally excellent with the only pitfall being that the droning Stills' vocal pervades all but one of the LP's sixteen cuts". He also stated the "lyrics represent a low-point in Stills' lyricist career". Chris Welch for Melody Maker said "The blues, soul, rock and country music are all the influences. They play them like the Grateful Dead, with a sincerity and ability that one does not always detect in the work of those exclusively involved in the original idiom".

Andrew Weiner for Creem said "Stills, perhaps the most maligned superstar in recent rock history, has finally - and against all the odds - got it on. And Stills has written too many good songs here even to try count them".

Stills has stated the album did not receive the recognition it deserved due to Atlantic Records and Ahmet Ertegun (head of Atlantic Records) wanting him back in the "goldmine" that was Crosby, Stills, Nash & Young. Stills has stated that as soon as the album shipped gold, Ertegun pulled the record, and people could not find it in stores.

Due to the critics' dislike of Stills at the time for being too arrogant, he was passed up for the May 11, 1972 cover of Rolling Stone for David Cassidy, as fictionally shown in the Martin Scorsese produced TV series Vinyl.

The album was certified Gold on May 30, 1972, just over a month after being released.

The album was included in the book 1001 Albums You Must Hear Before You Die.

It was voted number 735 in Colin Larkin's All Time Top 1000 Albums 3rd Edition (2000).

Track listing

Personnel
Manassas
Stephen Stills - vocals, guitar, bottleneck guitar, piano, organ, electric piano, clavinet, Moog synthesizer
Chris Hillman - vocals, guitar, mandolin
Al Perkins - pedal steel guitar, guitar, vocals
Paul Harris - organ, tack piano, piano, electric piano, clavinet
Dallas Taylor - drums
Calvin "Fuzzy" Samuels - bass
Joe Lala - congas, timbales/percussion, vocals
Additional players
Sydney George (on "The Raven" and "The Wilderness") - harmonica
Jerry Aiello (on "The Raven" and "The Wilderness") - piano, organ, electric piano, clavinet
Bill Wyman (on "The Raven" and "The Wilderness") - bass
Roger Bush (on "The Raven" and "The Wilderness") - acoustic bass
Byron Berline - fiddle
Malcolm Cecil  - Expanded Series III Moog Synthesizer programming
Technical
 The Albert Brothers - engineers
Stephen Stills, Ira H. Wexler - cover design
Ira H. Wexler - photography

Special thanks to Bruce Berry & Guillermo Giachetti, Daniel J. Campbell, Michael John Bowen, Michael O'Hara Garcia, Buddy P. Zoloth, Edward Astrin & Ahmet Ertegun

Charts 

Year-end album charts

Certifications

Tour 
Manassas toured across the world in 1972, this being Stills biggest solo tour date, playing arenas in Americas, and headlining festivals in Australia. After the initial Manassas tour from 9 April to 20 May. Manassas then completed five tours in six months, from July 14 to July 30 they toured the West Coast, the second tour from 11 to 28 August toured the East Coast, they then toured Europe and Scandinavia from September 13 to October 9. The fourth tour was a tour of Midwestern American Colleges, and finally the fifth tour was conducted in the South from December 1–19. During this tour Manassas had a charter plane and toured manically, but Stills was losing money on these tours as he was paying the band very generously.

Manassas

 Stephen Stills - vocals, guitar, keyboards
 Chris Hillman - vocals, guitar, mandolin
 Al Perkins - pedal steel guitar, guitar, vocals
 Paul Harris – organ, piano, electric piano, clavinet
 Dallas Taylor – drums
 Calvin "Fuzzy" Samuels – bass
 Joe Lala – congas, timbales/percussion, vocals

Tour setlist

Typical tour set list

All songs written by Stephen Stills, except where noted.

 "Rock and Roll Woman"
 "Bound to Fall"
 "Hot Burrito #2"
 "It Doesn't Matter"
 "So You Want to Be a Rock'n'Roll Star" (Jim McGuinn, Chris Hillman) (also played on April 22, 1972, in Dania, FL)
 "Go Back Home"
 "Change Partners"
 "Know You Got to Run" (Stills, John Hopkins)
 "Crossroads Blues" (Robert Johnson) (also played on April 22, 1972, in Dania, FL)
 "Black Queen" (also played on April 22, 1972, in Dania, FL)
 "4+20"
 "Blues Man"
 "Word Game"
 "Do for the Others"
 "Move Around"
 "Both of Us (Bound to Loose)" (Stills, Chris Hillman)
 "Love the One You're With"
 "He Was a Friend of Mine"
 "Fallen Eagle"
 "Hide It So Deep"
 "Johnny's Garden" (or "You're Still on My Mind" (Luke McDaniel) (played on April 22, 1972, in Dania, FL))
 "Don't Look at My Shadow"
 "Sugar Babe"
 "49 Bye-Byes" (also played on April 22, 1972, in Dania, FL)
 "For What It's Worth"
 "Song of Love"
 "Rock & Roll Crazies"
 "Cuban Bluegrass"
 "Jet Set (Sigh)"
 "Anyway"
 "The Treasure"
 "Carry On" (also played on April 22, 1972, in Dania, FL)
 "Find the Cost of Freedom/Daylight Again"

References 

Manassas (band) albums
1972 debut albums
Atlantic Records albums